Gignaw is a village in the Bhiwani district of the Indian state of Haryana. , the village had 556 households with a total population of 2,357 of which 1,222 were male and 1,135 female.

History 
Gignow is a historic village. In old time it was known as gigangarh. King rishalu ruled here in 5th century and palace of raja rishalu.

Famous temple 
In Gignow three temples are famous in which two are very old from historic period Dada Garhwala and Baba Madiya. Shiv Mandir is newly build due to the tragic story happens on same place on highway which is very painful accident.

Transport 
Gignow is near by Badhra Tehsil towards east, Kairu Tehsil towards north, Behal Tehsil towards west, Surajgarh Tehsil towards south and Jhumpa Kalan (2 km), Barwas (6 km), Gothra (6 km), Jhanjhara Sheoran (6 km), Dhigawa Shamiyan (6 km) are the nearby Villages to Gignow and near by cities are Pilani, Bhiwani, Mahendragarh, Charkhi Dadri, Chirawa. By train destination is Kushal Pura and Parvezpur Railway Station are both nearby railway stations to Gignow.

Airport distance from Gignow 
Indira Gandhi International Airport (Delhi) - 142 km

Sanganeer Airport (Jaipur) - 212 km

Surat Gujarat Airport (Surat)- 226 km

Historic places nearby

Further reading 

Villages in Bhiwani district